Khatereh Asadi (born 29 August 1983) is an Iranian actress.

Biography 

Asadi was born on 29 August 1983 in Tehran and graduated in School of Radio & Television Art & Literature. She holds a bachelor's degree in drama, majoring in acting from the Faculty of Art & Architecture from Islamic Azad University. She began working in cinema and television in the early 1980s.
She was nominated for "Best Drama Actress" on Hafez Awards for her role in Forbidden. She was also nominated for "Best Supporting Actress" in Crystal Simorgh Film Festival for Aida, I Saw Your Dad Last Night.

Filmography
 Crossroads (2006) as Shadi
Praise (2006)
 Aida, I Saw Your Father Last Night (2005) as Sanaz
Day and Night (2008)
 Shirin (2008) as Herself
Barf Rooye Shirvani Dagh (Snow on a Hot Tin Roof) (2011)
Annunciation to a Third Millennium Citizen (2013)
Blind Spot (2015)
Hot Scent (2020)
Haft Daghighe ta Paeez (Seven Minutes to Fall) (2020)

Serials  
 Fall of an Angel, directed by Bahram Bahramian
 Forbidden, directed by Amir Pourkian (Nominated for Best Drama Actress in Hafez Ceremony)
 Ordinary People, directed by Rambod Javan.
Afra, directed by Ebrahim Ebrahimian.

Theatre 
 Droughts and Lies (2015) directed by Mohammad Yaghoubi
Hamsaye Agha, directed by Hossein Kiani
 Saadi Theater, Summer 32, directed by Hossein Kiani
 The Silence of the Sea, directed by Nima Dehghan

Nominations 
Best Supporting Actress, Crystal Simorgh Film Festival, for her role in for Aida, I Saw Your Dad Last Night.
 Best Drama Actress, on 19th Hafez Awards, for her role in Forbidden

References

External links
 
 

1983 births
Living people
People from Tehran
Actresses from Tehran
Iranian film actresses
Iranian stage actresses
Iranian television actresses
Islamic Azad University alumni
21st-century Iranian actresses